2000 Czech Lion Awards ceremony was held on 3 March 2001.

Winners and nominees

Non-statutory Awards

References

2000 film awards
Czech Lion Awards ceremonies